Davis Charles Rohr (born October 29, 1929) was a major general in the United States Air Force.

Biography
Rohr was born in Burlington, Wisconsin and graduated from Burlington High School. Later he attended Northwestern University and the University of Washington.

Career
Rohr graduated from the United States Military Academy in 1952. He joined the Air Force the following year. During the Korean War, he served with the 51st Fighter-Interceptor Wing and at Misawa Air Base. In 1960, he was assigned to the United States Air Force Academy as a member of the faculty. During the Vietnam War, he served with the 31st Tactical Fighter Wing. Later he was given the command of the 67th Tactical Reconnaissance Wing and the 388th Tactical Fighter Wing. Following his service in the war, he entered the Industrial College of the Armed Forces. In 1984, he was named Deputy Commander in Chief of the United States Central Command. His retirement was effective as of July 1, 1987.

Awards he has received include the Defense Superior Service Medal with oak leaf cluster, the Legion of Merit with oak leaf cluster, the Distinguished Flying Cross, the Purple Heart, the Meritorious Service Medal, the Air Medal with two silver oak leaf clusters and four bronze oak leaf clusters, and the Air Force Commendation Medal.

References

1929 births
Living people
United States Air Force generals
United States Air Force personnel of the Korean War
United States Air Force personnel of the Vietnam War
Recipients of the Legion of Merit
Recipients of the Distinguished Flying Cross (United States)
Recipients of the Air Medal
Recipients of the Defense Superior Service Medal
United States Air Force Academy faculty
United States Military Academy alumni
Northwestern University alumni
University of Washington alumni
People from Burlington, Wisconsin
Military personnel from Wisconsin